The Vilnius Jazz Festival is a jazz festival held in Vilnius, Lithuania. In 2018, it was held for the 31st time; the programme included: Nate Wooley’s Knknighgh Quartet, Shai Maestro Trio, Sofia Jernberg, Vincent Courtois, Brian Marsella Trio, Ping Machine, Reinless and Paweł Brodowski

References

External links

Jazz festivals in Lithuania
Events in Vilnius
Annual events in Lithuania
Music in Vilnius